Billal Ouali (born May 15, 1987 in M'Sila) is an Algerian football player who is currently playing for AS Aïn M'lila in the Algerian Ligue Professionnelle 1.

Club career
In August 2007, he was handed a trial with Ligue 1 side OGC Nice but he failed to impress the coach .

On July 14, 2011, Ouali was loaned out to JSM Béjaïa for one season.

References

External links
DZfoot Profile

1987 births
Algerian footballers
Algerian Ligue Professionnelle 1 players
Algerian Ligue 2 players
JSM Béjaïa players
Living people
People from M'Sila
Paradou AC players
MC Alger players
Association football forwards
21st-century Algerian people